SOKO SP RR (also known as, SOKO self-propelled rapid response) is a truck-mounted self-propelled howitzer developed by Serbian arms manufacturer Yugoimport. It is based on integration of 122 mm 35-calibre D-30 J howitzer with a six-wheel drive truck chassis.

SOKO was unveiled during the SOFEX 2010 in Jordan.

See also
122mm SORA
 2S1 Gvozdika

Notes

122 mm artillery
Self-propelled howitzers of Serbia
Wheeled self-propelled howitzers
Serbian inventions
Military Technical Institute Belgrade